Impossibilism is a Marxist theory that stresses the limited value of political, economic, and social reforms under capitalism. As a doctrine, impossibilism views the pursuit of such reforms as counterproductive to the goal of achieving socialism as they stabilize, and therefore strengthen, support for capitalism. Impossibilism holds that reforms to capitalism are irrelevant or outright counter-productive to the goal of achieving socialism and should not be a major focus of socialist politics.

Impossibilists insist that socialists should primarily or solely focus on structural changes (sometimes termed "revolutionary changes") to society as opposed to advancing social reforms. Impossibilists argue that spontaneous revolutionary action is the only viable method of instituting the structural changes necessary for the construction of socialism; impossibilism is thus held in contrast to reformist socialist parties that aim to rally support for socialism through the implementation of popular social reforms (such as a welfare state). It is also held in contrast to those who believe that socialism can emerge through gradual economic reforms implemented by an elected social democratic political party.

Impossibilism is the opposite of "possibilism" and "immediatism". Possibilism and immediatism are based on a gradualist path to socialism and a desire on the part of socialists to help ameliorate the social ills immediately through practical programs implemented by existing institutions including labor unions and electoral politics, thereby de-emphasizing the ultimate objective of building a socialist economy. This position is justified by the fact that socialists who embraced possibilism sounded and acted little different from non-socialist reformers in practice.

Impossibilist movements are also associated with anti-Leninism in their opposition to both vanguardism and democratic centralism.

Origins of the concept 

The concept of impossibilism—though not the specific term—was introduced and heavily influenced by American Marxist theoretician Daniel De Leon on the basis of theory that De Leon generated before his interest in syndicalism began. It came to be focused especially on the question of whether socialists should take part in government and pursue policy reforms that benefited the working-class under capitalism.

At the Paris Congress of the Second International in 1900, those who favored entry into government with all the implied compromises called themselves "Possibilists" while those who opposed them (those around Jules Guesde) characterized them as political "Opportunists". Conversely, the revolutionary socialists who opposed ameliorative reforms and participation in existing governments were called "Impossibilists" by their detractors because they allegedly sought the impossible by refusing to partake in the governing of capitalism.

While not usually described as an impossibilist, Rosa Luxemburg opposed both reformism and vanguardism, taking the more classical Marxist perspective that revolution would be a spontaneous reaction to underlying material changes in the productive forces of society. According to Luxemburg, "[political and juridical relations of capitalism] is not overthrown, but is on the contrary strengthened and consolidated by the development of social reforms and the course of democracy.".

Basis in Karl Marx's work 

Karl Marx famously critiqued reformism and immediatist/possibilist goals advocated by modern social democrats in his Address of the Central Committee to the Communist League (1850). Specifically, he argued that measures designed to increase wages, improve working conditions and provide welfare payments would be used to dissuade the working class away from socialism and the revolutionary consciousness he believed was necessary to achieve a socialist economy and would thus be a threat to genuine structural changes to society by making the conditions of workers in capitalism more tolerable through reform and welfare schemes.

Political groups 
 French Workers' Party
 Proletarian Party of America
 Social Democratic Federation
 Socialist Party of Great Britain
 Socialist Party of Canada
 Socialist Party of Canada (WSM)
 Socialist Labor Party of America
 World Socialist Party (Ireland)
 World Socialist Party of India

See also 
 Anti-Leninism
 Libertarian possibilism
 Libertarian socialism
 Orthodox Marxism
 Possibilism
 Reformism
 Revolutionary socialism
 Revolutionary spontaneity

References

External links 
 "Impossibilism," Encyclopedia of Marxism, Marxists Internet Archive, marxists.org/ Retrieved October 16, 2010.
 Larry Gambone, "The History Of Canadian Impossibilism," Socialist History Project, socialisthistory.ca/ Retrieved October 16, 2010.

Socialism
Marxism
Left communism
Political science terminology
Libertarian socialism